Willow Creek Dam can refer to:

 Willow Creek Dam (Colorado)
 Willow Creek Dam (Montana)
 Willow Creek Dam (Nebraska)
 Willow Creek Dam (Oregon)